Spirino is a rural locality (a village) in Kurilovskoye Rural Settlement, Sobinsky District, Vladimir Oblast, Russia. The population was 3 as of 2010.

Geography 
Spirino is located on the Vorsha River, 18 km northwest of Sobinka (the district's administrative centre) by road. Stepankovo is the nearest rural locality.

References 

Rural localities in Sobinsky District